The 2022 Professional Chess Association of the Philippines season will be the second season of the Professional Chess Association of the Philippines (PCAP), a professional chess league in the Philippines.

The season will open on January 22, 2022, with the All-Filipino Conference.

Teams
There are 24 teams in the PCAP as of the second season divided into two geographic groups.

North
Laguna Heroes (Cabuyao)
Cagayan Kings
Caloocan Loadmanna Knights
Isabela Knights of Alexander
Cavite Spartans (General Trias)
Manila Indios Bravos
Mindoro Tamaraws
Olongapo Rainbow Team 7
Pasig City King Pirates
Quezon City Simba's Tribe
Rizal Batch Towers
San Juan Predators

South
Cagayan De Oro
Camarines-Iriga
Cebu City Machers
Davao Chess Eagles
Iloilo Kisela Knights
Negros Kingsmen
Pagadian PCL
Palawan Queens' Gambit
Surigao Fianchetto Checkmates
Tacloban Vikings
Toledo City Trojans
Zamboanga Sultans

Team changes
Three teams which entered the 2021 season did not enter:

Antipolo Cobras
Cordova Dutchess Dagami Warriors (leave of absence)
Lapu-Lapu City Naki Warriors (leave of absence)

Four teams entered this season 
 Team Cagayan de Oro
 Davao Chess Eagles (2021 Open Conference guest team)
 Tacloban Vikings
 Pagadian PCL (new team in 2022 PCAP 2nd Conference-Wesley So Cup) 

Guest Teams (2022 Open Conference) 
 Pasig Grassroots Knights (Pasig Juniors) 
 Philippine Executive Chess Association 

One team moved to another division
 Mindoro Tamaraws (South to North)

Name changes
 The Toledo City Chess Miners changed their name to the Toledo City Trojans before the start of the season.
 The Davao Chess Wizards changed their name to the Davao Chess Eagles before the start of the season.
 The Camarines Soaring Eagles & Iriga City Oragons were merged into Camarines-Iriga before the start of the 2022 PCAP 2nd Conference.

References

Professional Chess Association of the Philippines season
Professional Chess Association of the Philippines season
Chess in the Philippines